Shahin Kermanshah Futsal Club is an Iranian professional futsal club based in Kermanshah.

Season by season
The table below chronicles the achievements of the Club in various competitions.

Last updated: 17 February 2022

Honours 
 Iran Futsal's 1st Division
 Champions (1): 2018–19

Players

Current squad

Personnel

Current technical staff

Last updated: 9 April 2022

References 

Futsal clubs in Iran
2012 establishments in Iran
Futsal clubs established in 2012